Rain Man is a 1988 American road comedy-drama film directed by Barry Levinson and written by Barry Morrow and Ronald Bass. It tells the story of abrasive, selfish young wheeler-dealer Charlie Babbitt (Tom Cruise), who discovers that his estranged father has died and bequeathed virtually all of his multimillion-dollar estate to his other son, Raymond (Dustin Hoffman), an autistic savant, of whose existence Charlie was unaware. 

Charlie is left with only his father's beloved vintage car and rosebushes. Valeria Golino also stars as Charlie's girlfriend Susanna. Morrow created the character of Raymond after meeting Kim Peek, a real-life savant; his characterization was based on both Peek and Bill Sackter, a good friend of Morrow who was the subject of Bill (1981), an earlier film that Morrow wrote.

Rain Man premiered at the 39th Berlin International Film Festival, where it won the Golden Bear, the festival's highest prize. It was theatrically released by MGM/UA Communications Co. in the United States on December 16, 1988, to critical and commercial success. Praise was given towards Levinson's direction, the performances (particularly Cruise's and Hoffman's), the instrumental score, Morrow's screenplay, the cinematography, the film's portrayal of autism. The film grossed $354.8-412.8million, on a $25 million budget, becoming the highest-grossing film of 1988, and received a leading eight nominations at the 61st Academy Awards, winning four (more than any other film nominated); Best Picture, Best Director, Best Actor (for Hoffman), and Best Original Screenplay.

, Rain Man is the first and only film to win both the Berlin International Film Festival's highest award and the Academy Award for Best Picture in the same year. It was also the last MGM title to be nominated for Best Picture until Licorice Pizza (2021) 33 years later.

Plot

Collectibles dealer Charlie Babbitt is in the middle of importing four grey market Lamborghinis to Los Angeles for resale. He needs to deliver the cars to impatient buyers, who have already made down payments, in order to repay the loan he took out to buy them, but the EPA is holding the cars at the port because they have failed emission tests. Charlie directs an employee to lie to the buyers while he stalls his creditor.

When Charlie learns that his estranged father Sanford Babbitt has died, he and his girlfriend Susanna travel to Cincinnati in order to settle the estate. He inherits only a group of rosebushes and a classic 1949 Buick Roadmaster convertible over which he and his father had clashed, while the remainder of the $3million estate is going to an unnamed trustee. He learns that the money is being directed to a local mental institution, where he meets his elder brother, Raymond, of whom he was unaware his whole life.

Raymond has savant syndrome and autism and adheres to strict routines. He has superb recall, but he shows little emotional expression except when in distress. Charlie spirits Raymond out of the mental institution and into a hotel for the night. Disgusted with the way Charlie treats his brother, Susanna leaves him. Charlie asks Raymond's doctor, Dr. Gerald Bruner, for half the estate in exchange for Raymond's return, but Bruner refuses. Charlie decides to attempt to gain custody of his brother in order to get control of the money.

After Raymond refuses to fly to Los Angeles, he and Charlie resort to driving there instead. They make slow progress because Raymond insists on sticking to his routines, which include watching The People's Court on television every day, getting to bed by 11:00 p.m., and refusing to travel when it rains. He also objects to traveling on the interstate after they encounter a car accident. During the course of the journey, Charlie learns more about Raymond, including his ability to instantly perform complex calculations and count hundreds of objects at once, far beyond the normal range of human abilities. He also realizes Raymond had lived with the family as a child and was the "Rain Man" (Charlie's infantile pronunciation of "Raymond"), a comforting figure that Charlie had falsely remembered as an imaginary friend. Raymond had saved an infant Charlie from being scalded by hot bathwater one day, but their father had blamed him for nearly injuring Charlie and committed him to the institution, as he was unable to speak up for himself and correct the misunderstanding.

Charlie's creditor repossesses the Lamborghinis, forcing him to refund his buyers' down payments and leaving him deeply in debt. Having passed Las Vegas, he and Raymond return to Caesars Palace on the Strip and devise a plan to win the needed money by playing blackjack and counting cards. Though the casino bosses obtain videotape evidence of the scheme and ask them to leave, Charlie successfully wins $86,000 to cover his debts and reconciles with Susanna, who has rejoined the brothers in Las Vegas.

Returning to Los Angeles, Charlie meets with Bruner, who offers him $250,000 to walk away from Raymond. Charlie refuses and says that he is no longer upset about being cut out of his father's will, but he wants to have a relationship with his brother. At a meeting with a court-appointed psychiatrist, Raymond proves unable to decide for himself what he wants. Charlie stops the questioning and tells Raymond he is happy to have him as his brother. As Raymond and Bruner board a train to return to the institution, Charlie promises to visit in two weeks.

Cast

 Dustin Hoffman as Raymond "Ray" Babbitt
 Tom Cruise as Charles "Charlie" Babbitt
 Valeria Golino as Susanna
 Jerry Molen as Dr. Gerald Bruner
 Ralph Seymour as Lenny
 Michael D. Roberts as Vern
 Bonnie Hunt as Sally Dibbs
 Beth Grant as Mother at Farm House
 Lucinda Jenney as Iris
 Barry Levinson as Doctor
 Bob Heckel as Sheriff Deputy

Production

In drafting the story for Rain Man, Barry Morrow decided to base the Dustin Hoffman's character, Raymond Babbitt, on his experiences with both Kim Peek and Bill Sackter, two men who had gained notoriety and fame for their intellectual disabilities. Prior to the conception of Rain Man, Morrow had formed a friendship with the intellectually disabled Sackter, and in doing so ended up taking some situational aspects from his friendship and using them to help craft the relationship between Charlie and Raymond. Following the success of the made-for-TV movie he had written about Sackter, Bill, Morrow met Kim Peek and was wildly intrigued by his Savant Syndrome. Initially going into the creation of the film, Morrow was essentially unaware of the intricacies of the condition, as well as of autism itself, deciding instead the movie was less about Raymond's intellectual disability and more about the relationship formed between Raymond and Charlie.

Roger Birnbaum was the first studio executive to give the film a green light; he did so immediately after Barry Morrow pitched the story. Birnbaum received "special thanks" in the film's credits.

Real-life brothers Dennis Quaid and Randy Quaid were considered for the roles of Raymond Babbitt and Charles Babbitt. Agents at CAA sent the script to Dustin Hoffman and Bill Murray, envisioning Murray in the title role and Hoffman in the role eventually portrayed by Cruise. Martin Brest, Steven Spielberg and Sydney Pollack were directors also involved in the film. Mickey Rourke was also offered a role but he turned it down.

For a year prior to playing Raymond Babbitt, Hoffman prepared to portray Raymond's autism by seeking out and educating himself on other people with autism, particularly those with Savant Syndrome. Hoffman had some experience with disabled individuals prior to filming, having worked at the New York Psychiatric Institute when he was younger. Inspiration for the portrayal of Raymond Babbitt's mannerisms was drawn from a multitude of sources, including Kim Peek and the autistic brother of a Princeton football player with whom Hoffman was in touch at the time. Part of Hoffman's research into the role also included in-person meetings with savant Kim Peek, wherein he would observe and mimic Peek's actions in order to attempt to give an accurate portrayal at what an individual with Savant Syndrome might act like. His mimicry of Peek's Savant Syndrome was deemed a poor fit for the character by Hoffman, resulting in Hoffman deciding to make Babbitt not only a man with Savant Syndrome, but also a man with autism. This decision was one that proved to only further the misunderstanding of autism spectrum disorder among the general public: though autism is, in itself, a varying condition with numerous ways in which it is characterized, having both autism and Savant Syndrome is an incredibly rare occurrence. Even so, audiences were swayed into thinking that most autistic individuals were intellectually capable of savant abilities largely by Hoffman's portrayal of Raymond Babbitt.

Principal photography included nine weeks of filming on location in Cincinnati and throughout northern Kentucky. Other portions were shot in the desert near Palm Springs, California.

There was originally a different ending to the movie drafted by Morrow which differed from Raymond going back to the institution. Morrow ultimately decided to drop this ending in favor of Raymond returning to the institution, as he felt the original ending would not have stuck with the viewers as effectively as the revised ending did.

Almost all of the principal photography occurred during the 1988 Writers Guild of America strike; one key scene that was affected by the lack of writers was the film's final scene. Bass delivered his last draft of the script only hours before the strike started and spent no time on the set.

Release

Box office
Rain Man debuted on December 16, 1988, and was the second highest-grossing film at the weekend box office (behind Twins), with $7million. It reached the first spot on the December 30 – January 2 weekend, finishing 1988 with $42million. The film would end up as the highest-grossing U.S. film of 1988 by earning over $172million. Worldwide figures vary; Box Office Mojo claims that the film grossed over $354million worldwide, while The Numbers reported that the film grossed $412.8million worldwide.

Critical response
On review aggregator website Rotten Tomatoes the film holds an approval rating of 89% based on 133 reviews, with an average rating of 8.10/10. The website's critical consensus states: "This road-trip movie about an autistic savant and his callow brother is far from seamless, but Barry Levinson's direction is impressive, and strong performances from Tom Cruise and Dustin Hoffman add to its appeal." Metacritic assigned the film a weighted average score of 65 out of 100 based on 18 critics, indicating "generally favorable reviews". Audiences polled by CinemaScore gave the film an average grade of "A" on an A+ to F scale.

Vincent Canby of The New York Times called Rain Man a "becomingly modest, decently thought-out, sometimes funny film"; Hoffman's performance was a "display of sustained virtuosity . . . [which] makes no lasting connections with the emotions. Its end effect depends largely on one's susceptibility to the sight of an actor acting nonstop and extremely well, but to no particularly urgent dramatic purpose." Canby considered the "film's true central character" to be "the confused, economically and emotionally desperate Charlie, beautifully played by Mr. Cruise."

Amy Dawes of Variety wrote that "one of the year's most intriguing film premises ... is given uneven, slightly off-target treatment"; she called the road scenes "hastily, loosely written, with much extraneous screen time," but admired the last third of the film, calling it a depiction of "two very isolated beings" who "discover a common history and deep attachment."

One of the film's harshest reviews came from New Yorker magazine critic Pauline Kael, who said, "Everything in this movie is fudged ever so humanistically, in a perfunctory, low-pressure way. And the picture has its effectiveness: people are crying at it. Of course they're crying at it—it's a piece of wet kitsch."

Roger Ebert gave the film three and a half stars out of four. He wrote, "Hoffman proves again that he almost seems to thrive on impossible acting challenges...I felt a certain love for Raymond, the Hoffman character. I don't know quite how Hoffman got me to do it." Gene Siskel also gave the film three and a half stars out of four, singling out Cruise for praise: "The strength of the film is really that of Cruise's performance...the combination of two superior performances makes the movie worth watching."

Rain Man was placed on 39 critics' "ten best" lists in 1988, based on a poll of the nation's top 100 critics.

Accolades

Legacy 
The release of Rain Man in 1988 coincided with a tenfold increase in funding for medical research and diagnoses of individuals for autism.  The latter is primarily due to autism being more broadly defined in newer editions of the DSM, particularly versions III-R and IV.  The movie is credited, however, with significantly increasing awareness of autism among the general public.

Rain Man is a movie famous in particular for its portrayal of a man with both autism and Savant Syndrome, leading much of its viewing audience to understand the intellectual capabilities of those with autism in an incorrect way.  The character of Raymond Babbitt has been criticized for fitting into the stereotype of the "Magical/Savant" autistic character. Characters like these are portrayed as having an otherworldly intellectual ability that, rather than disable them from living a "normal" life, instead assists them in a nearly magical way, causing those around them to be in awe and wonder as to how a person might have this capability. While having Savant Syndrome is certainly a possibility for autistic individuals, the combination is incredibly rare.

In 2006, the film was recognized by the American Film Institute in their list of 100 Years...100 Cheers at #63.

In popular culture 
Rain Mans portrayal of the main character's condition has been seen as creating the erroneous media stereotype that people on the autism spectrum typically have savant skills, and references to Rain Man, in particular Dustin Hoffman's performance, have become a popular shorthand for autism and savantism. Conversely, Rain Man has also been seen as dispelling a number of other misconceptions about autism, and improving public awareness of the failure of many agencies to accommodate autistic people and make use of the abilities they do have, regardless of whether they have savant skills or not.

The film is also known for popularizing the misconception that card counting is illegal in the United States.

The Babbitt brothers appear in The Simpsons season 5 episode $pringfield. The film is mentioned in numerous other films such as Miss Congeniality (2000), 21 (2008), Tropic Thunder (2008) (in which Tom Cruise made an appearance), The Hangover (2009), Escape Room (2019), and also in the television series Breaking Bad.

Raymond Babbitt was caricatured as a rain cloud in the animated episode of The Nanny, "Oy to the World". During the episode, Fran fixes up CC the Abominable Babcock with the Rain Man. He is portrayed as a cloud of rain mumbling about weather patterns and being an excellent driver.

Qantas and airline controversy
During June 1989, at least fifteen major airlines showed edited versions of Rain Man that omitted a scene involving Raymond's refusal to fly, mentioning the crashes of American Airlines Flight 625, Delta Air Lines Flight 191, and Continental Airlines Flight 1713, except on Australia-based Qantas. Those criticizing this decision included film director Barry Levinson, co-screenwriter Ronald Bass, and George Kirgo (at the time the President of the Writers Guild of America, West). "I think it's a key scene to the entire movie," Levinson said in a telephone interview. "That's why it's in there. It launches their entire odyssey across country – because they couldn't fly." While some of those airlines cited as justification avoiding having airplane passengers feel uncomfortable in sympathy with Raymond during the in-flight entertainment, the scene was shown intact on flights of Qantas, and commentators noted that Raymond mentions it as the only airline whose planes have "never crashed".

The film is credited with introducing Qantas' safety record to U.S. consumers. However, contrary to the claims made in the film, Qantas aircraft have been involved in a number of fatal accidents since the airline's founding in 1920, though none involving jet aircraft, with the last incident taking place in December 1951.

The Buick convertible
Two 1949 Roadmaster convertibles were used in the filming, one of which had its rear suspension stiffened to bear the additional load of camera equipment and a cameraman. After filming completed, the unmodified car was acquired by Hoffman, who had it restored, added it to his collection and kept it for 34 years. Hemmings Motor News reported that this car was auctioned in January 2022 by Bonhams at Scottsdale, Arizona and sold for $335,000. The camera-carrying car was similarly acquired by Barry Levinson, who a few years later had it restored by Wayne Carini of the Chasing Classic Cars television series.

See also 
 Savant syndrome
 List of films set in Las Vegas

References

External links

 
 
 
 
 
 
 

1988 drama films
1988 films
1980s buddy drama films
1980s American films
1980s English-language films
1980s road comedy-drama films
American drama films
American buddy drama films
American road comedy-drama films
Best Drama Picture Golden Globe winners
Best Picture Academy Award winners
Films about autism
Films about brothers
Films about disability
Films about gambling
Films about obsessive–compulsive disorder
Films directed by Barry Levinson
Films featuring a Best Actor Academy Award-winning performance
Films featuring a Best Drama Actor Golden Globe winning performance
Films scored by Hans Zimmer
Films set in 1988
Films set in Cincinnati
Films set in Los Angeles
Films set in Missouri
Films set in the Las Vegas Valley
Films shot in California
Films shot in Indiana
Films shot in Kentucky
Films shot in Nevada
Films shot in Ohio
Films shot in Oklahoma
Films shot in the Las Vegas Valley
Films whose director won the Best Directing Academy Award
Films whose writer won the Best Original Screenplay Academy Award
Films with screenplays by Ronald Bass
Golden Bear winners
Metro-Goldwyn-Mayer films
United Artists films